Nugzar Tatalashvili (born March 20, 1990, in Gori, Georgian SSR, Soviet Union) is a Georgian judoka. He competed in the men's 73 kg event at the 2012 Summer Olympics and was eliminated by Wang Ki-Chun in the first round. Tatalashvili won silver Medal in 2013 European Judo Championships.

On 26 June 2015, representing Georgia at the 2015 European Games in the under 73 kg category, he won a silver medal.  He lost in the final to Sagi Muki of Israel.

References

External links

 
 
 
 

1990 births
Living people
Male judoka from Georgia (country)
Olympic judoka of Georgia (country)
Judoka at the 2012 Summer Olympics
Judoka at the 2015 European Games
European Games medalists in judo
European Games silver medalists for Georgia (country)